Jade Pettyjohn (born November 8, 2000) is an American actress. She is known for her roles as McKenna Brooks in An American Girl: McKenna Shoots for the Stars, as Summer on the Nickelodeon television series School of Rock, as Lexie Richardson on the Hulu drama television miniseries Little Fires Everywhere, and as Grace Sullivan on the ABC series Big Sky.

Life and career
Pettyjohn was born in Los Angeles, California. Prior to her film and television career, she performed alongside a local children's song and dance troupe from the age of seven. Pettyjohn has also played various roles in several television series, such as in Revolution, Criminal Minds: Suspect Behavior, Grimm, The United States Of Tara, The Mentalist, and Pure Genius. She co-starred in the Nickelodeon Original Movie Rufus 2 which aired in January 2017.

In September 2017, Pettyjohn was cast as Laura Dern's daughter in the movie Trial by Fire.  Additionally, she was added to the cast of the crime thriller film Destroyer, and appeared in the film Against All Enemies. In late 2018, Pettyjohn was cast in Deadwood: The Movie, playing the role of Caroline, a newcomer to the town of Deadwood. In 2019 she was cast in the Hulu television series Little Fires Everywhere playing Lexie Richardson, the daughter of Reese Witherspoon's character. In June 2020, it was announced that Pettyjohn had been cast in the ABC television drama series Big Sky, playing Grace Sullivan who is kidnapped along with her older sister Danielle (Natalie Alyn Lind).

Filmography

Film

Television

Video games
 World of Final Fantasy (2016), as Girl Who Forgot Her Name

Awards and nominations

References

External links
 
 

2000 births
Living people
American child actresses
American television actresses
American film actresses
Actresses from Los Angeles
21st-century American actresses